A métropole (French for "metropolis") is an administrative entity in France, in which several communes cooperate, and which has the right to levy local tax, an établissement public de coopération intercommunale à fiscalité propre. It is the most integrated form of intercommunality in France, more than the communauté urbaine, the communauté d'agglomération and the Communauté de communes. The métropoles were created by a law of January 2014.

As of July 2019, there are 20 métropoles, and 2 métropoles with special status (all in metropolitan France). The Metropolis of Lyon is a territorial collectivity, not an intercommunality.

List of Métropoles

References 

 
Fifth-level administrative divisions by country